Small the Joy is an extended play by the alternative rock band that would evolve into the group Fuel. The cassette was manufactured and printed by Klarity Kassette, Inc. The self-produced/made cassette tape was only issued in a very small limited number.

Track listing 
All songs by Carl Bell except where noted.

Side A 
 "Counter"
 "Gray"
 "Blind"
 "What More Am I?"

Side B 
 "Alive and Dying" (Brett Scallions)
 "Forgiveness"
 "Happy"
 "Stripped Away"

Personnel 
 Brett Scallions - lead vocals, rhythm guitar
 Carl Bell - lead guitar, backing vocals
 Jeff Abercrombie - bass
 Jody Abbott - drums
 Erik Avakian – keyboards, backing vocals

References

Fuel (band) albums
1994 debut EPs